The 2008 American League Division Series (ALDS), the first round of the 2008 American League playoffs, consisted of two best-of-five series. They were:

 (1) Los Angeles Angels of Anaheim (Western Division champions, 100–62) vs. (4) Boston Red Sox (Wild Card qualifier, 95–67): Red Sox win series, 3–1.
 (2) Tampa Bay Rays (Eastern Division champions, 97–65) vs. (3) Chicago White Sox (Central Division champions, 89–74): Rays win series, 3–1.
 
Since the Twins and the White Sox completed the regular season with identical records (88–74), the two teams played against each other in a one-game playoff. The White Sox defeated the Twins, 1–0, and thus became the AL Central champions.

The Rays defeated the Red Sox in the ALCS, and went on to lose the 2008 World Series to the National League champion Philadelphia Phillies.



Matchups

Los Angeles Angels of Anaheim vs. Boston Red Sox

Tampa Bay Rays vs. Chicago White Sox

Los Angeles vs. Boston

Game 1
Angel Stadium of Anaheim in Anaheim, California

In a re-match of last year's ALDS, starters Jon Lester and John Lackey were sharp early on, each tossing a couple of scoreless innings. The Angels finally got on the board in the third, when Torii Hunter singled home Garret Anderson to put the Angels up 1–0. Lackey held the Red Sox scoreless until the sixth, when newly acquired left fielder Jason Bay hit a two-run homer to put the Sox up 2–1. It would stay 2–1 until the ninth. The Sox got a couple of insurance runs, with Jacoby Ellsbury and David Ortiz each singling home a run. Jonathan Papelbon struck out the side in the bottom of the ninth for his fifth career postseason save. This marked the Angels' 10th consecutive playoff game loss to the Red Sox (dating back to Game 5 of the 1986 American League Championship Series), as well as their eighth consecutive playoff game loss overall (dating back to Game 2 of the 2005 ALCS).

Game 2
Angel Stadium of Anaheim in Anaheim, California

The Red Sox jumped out to an early lead in the first thanks to a three-run homer by Jason Bay. The Angels scored one run in the first off of an effective but inefficient Daisuke Matsuzaka and continued to chip away at Boston's lead throughout the game. In total, the Angels recorded 11 hits with 10 of them being singles. In the eighth inning Mark Teixeira tied the game with a sacrifice fly off of Jonathan Papelbon who had to enter the game prematurely due to Justin Masterson giving up a leadoff triple. The game entered the ninth inning tied at five but that deadlock was broken after a double by David Ortiz and a two-run home run to center by J. D. Drew off of Angels closer Francisco Rodríguez. Rodríguez was charged with the loss and although Papelbon had a blown save he also recorded the win. Boston, leading the series two games to none, headed back to Fenway Park. With their eleventh consecutive playoff win over the Angels, the Red Sox broke the record for consecutive playoff wins over another team, which had been set against them by the Oakland Athletics who beat the Red Sox in 10 consecutive playoff games from 1988 to 2003.

Game 3
Fenway Park in Boston, Massachusetts

The Angels got to an early lead when Juan Rivera drew a bases loaded walk to score Chone Figgins from third. A fielding miscue by the Angels in the second inning caused a fly ball hit by Jacoby Ellsbury to drop between Torii Hunter and Howie Kendrick in shallow center field, scoring three runs (Jed Lowrie, Jason Varitek, and Coco Crisp) and giving the Red Sox a two-run lead. The next inning, Mike Napoli tied the score with a two-run home run over the Green Monster that completely left the ballpark. In the fifth inning, Napoli hit another home run over the Monster, giving the Angels a one-run lead. Ellsbury and Kevin Youkilis hit back-to-back doubles in the bottom half of the inning to tie the score at four apiece. The score remained deadlocked until the top of the 12th inning, when Napoli scored from second on an Erick Aybar single. The Angels' win ended an 11-game postseason losing streak against the Red Sox that dated back to 1986, and a nine-game overall postseason skid that dated back to 2005.

Game 4
Fenway Park in Boston, Massachusetts

The game remained scoreless for the first four and a half innings thanks to sharp pitching from both John Lackey and Jon Lester.  In the bottom of the fifth inning, Boston got its first run when Jacoby Ellsbury grounded out to second base, scoring Mark Kotsay from third base.  Howie Kendrick bobbled the ball and was unable to try for a double play, which would have ended the inning.  Dustin Pedroia then hit a double off the left field wall to score Jason Varitek from second.  In the eighth inning, a passed ball allowed Mark Teixeira and Vladimir Guerrero to advance on second and third, and they subsequently scored on a single by Torii Hunter to tie the game.  In the top of the ninth inning, the Angels threatened with a leadoff double by pinch hitter Kendry Morales followed by a sacrifice bunt, but when Erick Aybar failed to make contact on a suicide squeeze attempt, the runner was tagged out.  In the bottom of the ninth inning, Jed Lowrie won the game with a walk-off single, scoring Jason Bay from second base.

Curiously, the last team to win their division by at least 20 games, the 1999 Cleveland Indians, also lost to Boston in the ALDS.

Composite box
2008 ALDS (3–1): Boston Red Sox over Los Angeles Angels of Anaheim

Tampa Bay vs. Chicago

Game 1
Tropicana Field in St. Petersburg, Florida

The Rays went up 1–0 in the second on rookie Evan Longoria's leadoff home run in his first postseason at-bat off of Javier Vazquez, but starter James Shields allowed consecutive leadoff singles in the third before DeWayne Wise's two-out three-run home run put the White Sox up 3−1. In the bottom of the inning, however, Jason Bartlett hit a leadoff single and scored on Akinori Iwamura's triple. After B. J. Upton struck out, Willy Aybar's sacrifice fly tied the game before Longoria's home run put Tampa up 4–3. The Rays added to their lead on Longoria's one-out single with two on off of Vazquez, who was then relieved by Clayton Richard and allowed an RBI single to Carl Crawford. Paul Konerko's leadoff home run in the ninth off of Dan Wheeler made it 6–4 Tampa, but Wheeler retired the next three batters to end the game and give the Rays a 1–0 series lead as they won their first postseason game in franchise history. Longoria became only the second ever player to homer in his first two career post-season at-bats, the other being Gary Gaetti in 1987.

Game 2
Tropicana Field in St. Petersburg, Florida

In Game 2, the White Sox loaded the bases off of Scott Kazmir in the first on a walk, hit-by-pitch, and single when Jim Thome's one-out single followed by Alexei Ramírez's sacrifice fly scored a run each. However, Kazmir and the Rays' bullpen would shut them out for the rest of the game. The White Sox left 12 runners on base and were 3 for 12 with them in scoring position. In the second, Willy Aybar hit a leadoff single off of Mark Buehrle, moved to third on Ramirez's throwing error to first on Rocco Baldelli's line out and scored on Dioner Navarro's single. In the fifth, Jason Bartlett singled with one out, then Akinori Iwamura's home run put the Rays up 3−2. They added insurance in the eighth when B. J. Upton hit a leadoff triple and scored on Carl Crawford's single to knock Buehrle out of the game. Crawford stole second, moved to third on a groundout, and scored on Baldelli's single off of Octavio Dotel. Baldelli then scored on Navarro's double off of Matt Thornton to put the Rays up 6−2. Chad Bradford pitched a scoreless ninth as the Rays took a 2−0 series lead heading to Chicago.

Game 3
U.S. Cellular Field in Chicago, Illinois

The Rays got on the board first when Akinori Iwamura singled with two outs in the second inning to score Dioner Navarro.  Chicago evened the score in the bottom of the third inning when DeWayne Wise scored on a single by A. J. Pierzynski after stealing second base.  Chicago took the lead in the bottom of the fourth when Alexei Ramírez hit a sacrifice fly with the bases loaded and one out.  Then DeWayne Wise doubled to score Paul Konerko and Ken Griffey Jr.  In the sixth inning, the White Sox added an insurance run when Juan Uribe drove in Brian Anderson with two outs.  The Rays finally chased starter John Danks after a two-run homer by B. J. Upton and a single by Carlos Peña.  Neither bullpen allowed any runs; Bobby Jenks recorded the save.

Game 4
U.S. Cellular Field in Chicago, Illinois

The Rays established an early lead after home runs by B. J. Upton in the first and third innings, and never gave up the lead.  The Rays added two more runs in the fourth on consecutive hits by Cliff Floyd and Dioner Navarro, and added two more runs on RBI singles by Carlos Peña in the fifth and seventh innings.  The White Sox scored on home runs by Paul Konerko (fourth inning) and Jermaine Dye (sixth inning), both off Rays starter Andy Sonnanstine who allowed three hits in  innings.

Composite box
2008 ALDS (3–1): Tampa Bay Rays over Chicago White Sox

References

External links
BOS vs. LAA at Baseball-Reference
TBR vs. CHW at Baseball-Reference

American League Division Series
American League Division Series
Tampa Bay Rays postseason
Boston Red Sox postseason
Chicago White Sox postseason
Los Angeles Angels of Anaheim postseason
American League Division Series
American League Division Series
American League Division Series
American League Division Series
21st century in Anaheim, California
American League Division Series
Baseball competitions in Boston
2000s in Chicago
Baseball competitions in Chicago
American League Division Series
21st century in St. Petersburg, Florida
American League Division Series
Baseball competitions in Anaheim, California
Baseball competitions in St. Petersburg, Florida